In Greek mythology, Anaxarete (Ancient Greek: Ἀναξαρέτη means 'excellent princess') was a Greek maiden, "a proud princess in the line of Teucer's descendants", who refused the advances of a shepherd named Iphis.

Mythology 
Iphis' advances were described in Ovid's Metamorphoses in the following paragraph:

“Now he would confess his sorry love to her nurse, asking her not to be hard on him, by the hopes she had for her darling. At other times he flattered each of her many attendants, with enticing words, seeking their favourable disposition. Often he gave them messages to carry to her, in the form of fawning letters. Sometimes he hung garlands on her doorpost wet with his tears, and lay with his soft flank on the hard threshold, complaining at the pitiless bolts barring the way.”

Anaxarete spurned him and mocked his feelings until he cried in despair and hanged himself on her doorstep. Anaxarete was still unmoved. When she mocked his funeral, calling it pitiful, Aphrodite turned her into a stone statue. According to Ovid, the statue was preserved at Salamis in Cyprus, in the temple of Venus Prospiciens.

A similar tale is told by Antoninus Liberalis, although he names the maiden Arsinoe, and her lover Arceophon.

Notes

References 

 Publius Ovidius Naso, Metamorphoses translated by Brookes More (1859-1942). Boston, Cornhill Publishing Co. 1922. Online version at the Perseus Digital Library.
 Publius Ovidius Naso, Metamorphoses. Hugo Magnus. Gotha (Germany). Friedr. Andr. Perthes. 1892. Latin text available at the Perseus Digital Library.

Ancient Cypriots
Metamorphoses characters
Metamorphoses into inanimate objects in Greek mythology
Women in Greek mythology

Characters in Greek mythology